La ley innata is the ninth studio album by Spanish hard rock band Extremoduro. It was produced by Iñaki "Uoho" Antón and published by Warner Music on 9 September 2008.

Track listing
Lyrics by Roberto Iniesta, music by Roberto Iniesta and Iñaki Antón.

Personnel 
Extremoduro
 Roberto "Robe" Iniesta – Vocals, guitar and backing vocals
 Iñaki "Uoho" Antón – Guitar, piano, organ and backing vocals
 Miguel Colino – Bass
 José Ignacio Cantera – Drums
Additional musicians
 Ara Malikian – Violin
 Thomas Potiron – Violin
 Humberto Armas – Viola
 Juan Pérez de Albéniz – Cello
 Gino Pavone –Percussion instrument
 Ander Erzilla – Oboe
 Mikel Piris – Flute
 Aiert Erkoreka – Piano
 Javier Mora – Piano on "Coda Flamenca (Otra Realidad)"
 Patxi Urchegui – Trumpet
 Sara Íñiguez – Backing vocals
 Airam Etxániz – Backing vocals
 Gastelo – Backing vocals on "Dulce introducción al caos"

Charts and certifications

Chart performance

Certifications

References

External links 
 Extremoduro official website (in Spanish)

2008 albums
Extremoduro albums
Spanish-language albums